The Solid Gold Cadillac is a 1956 comedy film directed by Richard Quine and written by Abe Burrows, Howard Teichmann, and George S. Kaufman. It was adapted from the hit Broadway play of the same name by Teichmann and Kaufman that pillories big business and corrupt businessmen. The film stars Judy Holliday and Paul Douglas. The film is in black-and-white except for the final scene, which is presented in Technicolor.

Plot
At a shareholders meeting for International Projects, a billion-dollar corporation, John T. Blessington announces that he is replacing Edward L. McKeever, the company's founder, president and chairman of the board who is resigning to work for the federal government in Washington D.C. Laura Partridge, a stockholder with just ten shares, infuriates the company's arrogant, self-serving executives with her incessant questioning during the meeting and continues to do so in subsequent meetings.

Blessington devises a plan to hire Laura for the meaningless position of director of shareholder relations in order to keep her occupied and out of the executives' business. He assigns her a secretary named Amelia with secret instructions to obstruct Laura as much as possible. With no substantial job duties, Laura begins to write letters to the stockholders. She gains Amelia's friendship and assistance by helping her develop a romantic relationship with the office manager.

When the directors discover that Amelia is helping Laura, they fire Amelia. However, Laura discovers that Blessington's unqualified brother-in-law Harry Harkness has driven an apparent competitor into bankruptcy, unaware that International Projects actually owns the company. With that as leverage, she gets Amelia rehired.

Still determined to neutralize Laura, the board sends her to Washington to persuade McKeever to award them some government contracts. She agrees to go, but secretly intends to convince McKeever to return and retake control from the crooked board even though he has sold his shares in the company. After Laura tells him about Harry's blunder, McKeever agrees to leave his government post and try to wrest control of the company. However, Blessington and his men block his attempt, and Laura quits.

McKeever brings the company to court, arguing that sending Laura to persuade him violated the lobbying laws, as she was not a registered lobbyist. When Laura is forced to admit on the stand that she had a romantic reason for seeing McKeever, the case is dropped. However, many of the smaller investors with whom Laura had forged relationships through her letters send their proxy votes, granting Laura the right to vote their shares. Laura and McKeever use these votes to replace the entire board. At a meeting of the new board, it is revealed that Laura has married McKeever.

For its final scene, the film changes from black-and-white to color, showing the small stockholders' wedding gift to Laura, a gleaming solid gold Cadillac that she drives around Manhattan.

Cast
 Judy Holliday as Laura Partridge
 Paul Douglas as Edward L. McKeever
 Fred Clark as Clifford Snell, the company treasurer
 John Williams as John T. Blessington
 Hiram Sherman as Harry Harkness, a director
 Neva Patterson as Amelia Shotgraven, assistant to Laura Partridge
 Ralph Dumke as Warren Gillie, a director
 Ray Collins as Alfred Metcalfe, another director
 Arthur O'Connell as Mark Jenkins, an office manager
 Harry Antrim as Senator Simpkins
 Richard Deacon as assistant to Edward L. McKeever
 George Burns as narrator

Reception
Bosley Crowther of The New York Times praised Holliday, stating, "[T]he invincible Miss Holliday has dared to project her youthful figure and personality into the character shaped by Miss Hull" (Josephine Hull, then in her seventies, played the role in the Broadway play) and is "knocking the role completely dead." However, he felt that the villains were neither particularly convincing ("not precisely representatives of the workaday financial world"), original ("cut from a fairly familiar stencil of Kaufmanesque farce") or formidable enough ("The problems set up by the play-wrights are little barriers of cardboard farce"). He concluded, "[I]t will give you an entertaining ride, but don't expect it to take you or your intelligence very far."

A Film4 reviewer agreed that the story was not particularly convincing ("Yeah – like global capitalism gets overthrown that easily"), but "even so, it's undemanding and amusing."

Awards and nominations
Jean Louis won the Academy Award for Best Costume Design Black and White. Ross Bellah, William Kiernan and Louis Diage were nominated for the Academy Award for Best Art Direction Black and White.

Holliday was nominated for the Golden Globe Award for Best Actress – Motion Picture Musical or Comedy, and the film was nominated for Best Motion Picture – Musical or Comedy.

See also
List of American films of 1956

References

External links
 
 
 
 

1956 films
1956 romantic comedy films
American business films
American romantic comedy films
American black-and-white films
Columbia Pictures films
1950s English-language films
American films based on plays
Films directed by Richard Quine
Films scored by Cyril J. Mockridge
Films set in New York City
Films set in Washington, D.C.
Films that won the Best Costume Design Academy Award
1950s American films